Orr's Island is an island in Casco Bay and the Gulf of Maine, part of the Atlantic Ocean. The island is within the town of Harpswell, Maine, U.S., and forms an archipelago with Sebascodegan Island (also known as Great Island) to its north and Bailey Island (reached by the Bailey Island (or Cribstone) Bridge) to its south.

Orr's Island is connected to Great Island by the Orr's Island/Great Island Bridge, and is connected to the town of Brunswick on the mainland by Route 24 north over the Gurnet Bridge. Bowdoin College operates a  coastal studies center on Orr's Island.

Demographics

As of 2010, Orr's Island had an estimated population of 539 people. 48.8% of the population was male, and 51.2% of the population was female. 98.3% of the population was white, 0.7% was Asian, 0.9% was two or more races, and 0.3% was some other race. Additionally, 90.2% of the population was 18 years or older, 32.7% was 65 years or older, and 1.7% was under 5 years of age.

In Popular Culture
Orr's island is the setting for the story in the 2000 American sci-fi horror movie They Nest.

Utilities
Orr's Island, like the rest of Harpswell is served power by Central Maine Power. There is no public water or sewer on the island, with most households having septic systems and drilled wells. Communications providers include Cribstone Communications, Consolidated Communications and Comcast.

See also
 List of islands of Maine

Further reading
 The Pearl of Orr's Island by Harriet Beecher Stowe, 1862.  
 Brunhilda of Orr's Island by William Jasper Nicolls, 1908.  
 The Story of Orr's Island, Maine by Annie Haven Thwing. 1926.

References

External links

 Town of Harpswell, Maine
 Orr's Island Library
 Orr's-Bailey Yacht Club
 Orr's Island Library
 Bowdoin Coastal Studies Center

Islands of Cumberland County, Maine
Harpswell, Maine
Islands of Casco Bay
Islands of Maine